Marcelino Pan y Vino, released as  in Japan, is an animated series.

In 2000, VIP Toons of Spain, PMMP and TF1 of France, Televisa of Mexico and Nippon Animation of Japan created the first TV series adaptation of the story, also titled Marcelino Pan y Vino after the original novel. The first 26-episode run (2000-2001) was adapted into several languages, including English, French, Spanish, Tagalog, Portuguese, and Italian, and became a success across Europe. An additional 26 episodes were made in 2004 and aired in Germany in 2006.

Characters

Protagonists
Marcelino - the main protagonist of the series. 
Candela 
Shadow
Leo 
Gizella

Antagonists
Duke Arthur Mostro - the main antagonist of the series. 
Pieru  
Martin  
Lucas - the hunter. 
Rufo  
Ivan  
Casio  
Constanble

Others
Chickens
Bonie
Lopu and Lopa
Doctor Mateo
Uro
Maria  
Thuseday

Episodes

Season 1
 Home
 The Africa Fly
 The Duke's Breakfast
 The King of The Forest
 The Golden Egg's Hen
 The Little Duchess
 A True Gentleman
 The Grand Hunt
 The Animal's Rebellion
 Just This Once
 The Acrobat
 Thursday
 And All Were Children
 The Magician's Watch
 Casio, The Lumberjack
 Doctor Mateo
 A Trap In The Forest
 Reme, The Hen
 A Question Of Size
 The Hot-Air Balloon
 The Dark Underworld
 My Friend, The Ghost
 At Sea
 The Deserted Island
 The Boy Of The Thousand Moons
 A Very Special

Season 2
 The Return of Marcelino
 The Gypsy Witch
 The Nasty Nephew
 Heavenly Honey
 Marcellino Counter-Attack
 Horn Free
 The Big Show
 School Days
 A Happy Event
 When I Grow Up
 The Flood
 Distant Cousins
 Aches And Pains
 The Mad Dog
 Treasure Hunt
 Night of The Meteorite
 The Duke's Bullfight
 The Birds
 The Traitor
 The Easter Surprise
 The Invisible Man
 Ines The Silly Goose
 Athalia
 Dangerous Games
 The Show Must Go On
 The Fakir's Snake

Season 3

References

External links
 Official Japanese Site at Nippon Animation 
 
 

Nippon Animation
2000s French animated television series
2000s Japanese animated television series
2000s Mexican animated television series
2000s Spanish animated television series
2001 French television series debuts
2001 Japanese television series debuts
2001 Mexican television series debuts
2001 Spanish television series debuts
2005 French television series endings
2005 Japanese television series endings
2005 Mexican television series endings
2005 Spanish television series endings
French children's animated action television series
Japanese children's animated action television series
Mexican children's animated action television series
Spanish children's animated action television series
French children's animated adventure television series
Japanese children's animated adventure television series
Mexican children's animated adventure television series
Spanish children's animated adventure television series
English-language television shows
Anime-influenced Western animated television series
Animated television series about children
TF1 original programming